Stuart Roberts may refer to:

 Stu Roberts (born 1965), former New Zealand cricketer
 Stuart Roberts (footballer, born 1967), Welsh footballer for Stoke City
 Stuart Roberts (footballer, born 1980), Welsh footballer
 Stuart Roberts (swimmer) (born 1951), British Olympic swimmer